Channel 14 is an Israeli commercial television channel aimed at a right-wing audience.

In 2021, it was announced that Channel 20 will be rebranded to Now 14 and subsequently moved to the 14th slot on TV receivers, right after Reshet 13. The move happened on 28 November that year.

The channel moved studios a couple times, and their most recent move was on the 28th of November 2021, when they moved to their current studio in Modi'in.

The channel primarily features news programming and, occasionally, religious programming, though the quantity of religious programs has been on a decline as the channel shifted to a more news-oriented approach over the years.

The most popular show on the channel is The Patriots, which feature a panel of journalists and other activists discussing issues in the world, as well as commenting on social media posts from various people, and everyone is given a limited time to give an opinion. When the time is over, a buzzer is activated.

Now 14's main news show is broadcast on 19:30 Israel time since 28 November 2021, unlike the other big three channels in Israel who broadcast their main news show at around 20:00.

History
 
Channel 20 started broadcasting on 30 June 2014.

Staff
Yinon Magal – Television presenter
Erel Segal – news anchor
Avraham Bloch – journalist 
Hillel Biton Rozen – journalist 
Efrat Finkel – journalist 
Erez Zadoc – journalist
Motty Castel – journalist
Shay Golden - Television presenter

See also
List of television channels in Israel

References

External links
 
Interview with the channel chairman Moti Sklar at TLV1

2014 establishments in Israel
2014 in Israeli television
Hebrew-language mass media
Television channels and stations established in 2014
Television channels in Israel